The 2016 NHL Stadium Series (branded as the 2016 Coors Light NHL Stadium Series for sponsorship reasons) was a series of two outdoor regular season National Hockey League (NHL) games played during the 2015–16 NHL season. The 2016 Stadium Series consisted of the Minnesota Wild versus the Chicago Blackhawks at TCF Bank Stadium in Minneapolis on February 21, 2016, and the Colorado Avalanche versus the Detroit Red Wings at Coors Field in Denver on February 27, 2016.

NBC aired both games in the United States, with the first game at TCF Bank Stadium being part of its Hockey Day in America coverage. The second game at Coors Field aired on NBC in primetime, the fourth regular season game (and the third outdoor game) to air on NBC's broadcast network in primetime (after the 2011 NHL Winter Classic, the 2014 NHL Stadium Series Game in Chicago, and a game on February 28, 2015 between the New York Rangers and the Philadelphia Flyers) since NBC won the broadcast contract for the NHL in 2004. In Canada, the game at TCF Bank Stadium was the first game of a tripleheader on Sportsnet (simulcast from the NBC feed), while the game at Coors Field aired as part of the Hockey Night in Canada coverage on Sportsnet.

TCF Bank Stadium (February 21)

The Minnesota Wild defeated the Chicago Blackhawks, 6–1 in the first 2016 Stadium Series game. Jason Pominville and Erik Haula each recorded a goal and two assists for the Wild. Minnesota goalie Devan Dubnyk made 31 saves, only allowing one goal by Patrick Kane with 7:55 left in the game. Also scoring for Minnesota was Thomas Vanek, Nino Niederreiter, Matt Dumba, and Ryan Carter.

Number in parenthesis represents the player's total in goals or assists to that point of the season

Coors Field (February 27)

In the second Stadium Series game, Brad Richards scored with 1:00 left in the game to break a 3–3 tie, and Darren Helm added an empty net goal, to give the Detroit Red Wings a 5–3 victory over the Colorado Avalanche.

Number in parenthesis represents the player's total in goals or assists to that point of the season

References

NHL Stadium Series
Stadium Series
Chicago Blackhawks games
Colorado Avalanche games
Detroit Red Wings games
Minnesota Wild games
February 2016 sports events in the United States
Ice hockey competitions in Minneapolis
Ice hockey competitions in Denver
2010s in Minneapolis
2010s in Denver
2016 in sports in Colorado
2016 in sports in Minnesota